NGC 4659 is a lenticular galaxy located about 54 million light-years away in the constellation Coma Berenices. NGC 4659 was discovered by astronomer William Herschel on April 12, 1784 and is a member of the Virgo Cluster.

See also 
 List of NGC objects (4001–5000)
 Lenticular galaxy

References

External links

Coma Berenices
Lenticular galaxies
4659
42913
7915
Astronomical objects discovered in 1784
Virgo Cluster